Andresia is a monotypic genus of cnidarians belonging to the family Andresiidae. The only species is Andresia partenopea.

The species is found in Western Europe.

References

Andresiidae